Antal Bodó (born 28 March 1958) is a Hungarian wrestler. He competed in the men's freestyle 100 kg at the 1980 Summer Olympics.

References

1958 births
Living people
Hungarian male sport wrestlers
Olympic wrestlers of Hungary
Wrestlers at the 1980 Summer Olympics
Sportspeople from Szeged